Gymnopilus abramsii is a species of mushroom-forming fungus in the family Hymenogastraceae. It was first described by American mycologist Murrill in 1917. The epithet abramsii commemorates LeRoy Abrams.

Description

Habitat and distribution
Found in California, Gymnopilus abramsii grows on soil, and typically fruits in November.

See also

 List of Gymnopilus species

References

abramsii
Fungi described in 1917
Fungi of North America
Taxa named by William Alphonso Murrill